The journalists killed during the Syrian Civil War refers to the foreign war correspondents, Syrian professional journalists (including those who work for pro-government media outlets), and Syrian citizen journalists (including those who work for opposition forces) killed since the beginning of the civil war in 2011 and who have died as a result of their reporting. Also included in a separate form are those journalists whose whereabouts are unknown or whose disappearance is a result of their reporting and the period of their disappearance, including those cases where it is unknown as to whether or not they are casualties.

The Doha Centre for Media Freedom has documented 110 professional or citizen journalists who have died during the Syrian civil war. The Syrian Journalists' Association has documented 153 journalists killed since the uprising and throughout the civil war, and 15 in March 2013. As of March 2013, the United Nations estimated that 70,000 people have been killed during the Syrian civil war.

Professional or citizen journalists/media activists killed in Syria

Professional or citizen journalists/media activists killed outside of Syria

Professional journalists who died from other circumstances

Professional journalists and citizen journalists/media activists who were missing and then freed

See also

 Syrian civil war
 Media of Syria
 Newspapers of Syria
 Pre-civil war and the role of media: Damascus Spring
 Human rights violations during the Syrian civil war
 Cities and towns during the Syrian civil war
 Siege of Homs
 2011–2012 Damascus clashes
 2011–2012 Daraa Governorate clashes
 2011–2012 Idlib Governorate clashes
 Battle of Aleppo (2012)

References

External links
 Doha Centre for Media Freedom

Citizen journalism
Human rights abuses in Syria

Syria

Syria
Lists of mass media in Syria
Journalists
Syria
Journalists
War correspondents of the Syrian civil war
Journalists